The Longwood Historic District is a recognized historic district located in the center of the Longwood neighborhood in the South Bronx, New York. It encompasses about three square blocks roughly bounded by Beck Street, Longwood, Leggett, and Prospect Avenues.

The district consists of semi-detached rowhouses, most of which have been converted into S.R.O.'s (Single Room Occupancy).  The district includes 61 contributing buildings.  It is primarily residential, but also includes the site of the former Prospect Hospital, two churches (United Church and St. Margaret's Episcopal Church), and a much altered estate house (Patrolman P. Lynch Community Center). Most of the semi-detached rowhouses were designed at the same time by one architect, Warren C. Dickerson. 

The New York City Landmarks Preservation Commission made it a historic district in 1980 and extended it in 1983.
On September 26, 1983, the district was added to the National Register of Historic Places.

References

Historic districts on the National Register of Historic Places in the Bronx
New York City designated historic districts
New York City Designated Landmarks in the Bronx
Longwood, Bronx